Spain and the World is the name of an anarchist publication initiated in response to the Spanish Civil War and the struggles of the CNT-FAI carrying analysis of events as they unfolded. In Britain, the Freedom Paper had begun to peter-out. Thomas Keell had attempted to close the paper down as a reflection of the poor state of the British anarchist movement. Though there was a brief dispute which resulted in two rival 'Freedoms', both had run their course by the early 1930s. The fortnightly publication, Spain and the World had been started by Francesco Galasso and Vernon Richards in 1936 to compete with News Chronicle and New Statesman who were supportive of Soviet policy in Spain.  "After the first issue, Spain and the World became a Freedom Press publication, with Tom Keell and Lilian Wolfe" according to Rooum. The paper would go on to revive the fortunes of the Freedom paper with input from important activists like Marie-Louise Berneri and Frank Leech.

Briefly, Spain and the World would become Revolt!, and then finally War Commentary in 1939 before returning to the publication of the Freedom Paper.

References

Further reading
Becker, Heiner (1986). Freedom: a Hundred Years, October 1886 to October 1986. London: Freedom Press. .
Meltzer, Albert (1996). I Couldn't Paint Golden Angels. Edinburgh, Scotland: San Francisco, CA. .

External links
 Complete archive of Spain and the World, via libcom.org.

Anarchist collectives
Anarchist newspapers
Works about the Spanish Civil War
1936 establishments in the United Kingdom
Anarchist periodicals published in the United Kingdom